A Scent Like Wolves is an American metalcore band from Lancaster, Pennsylvania, established in 2010 by founding members Al Boltz and Jeff Brown. They are currently signed to Los Angeles record label We Are Triumphant, a former imprint of Victory Records.

History
A Scent Like Wolves originally formed after a high school talent show in early 2010, taking the band name from a line in the movie Ninja Assassin. In November 2011, the artist won a local battle of the bands which led them to play nearby stadium, Santander Arena, with Hollywood Undead, We Came As Romans, amongst other groups. The band initially self-released their debut album And The Story Goes, on June 18, 2013. On November 2, 2013, A Scent Like Wolves performed at 'Reckless Fest II' alongside Asking Alexandria and 18 other bands held at the Lancaster County Convention Center.

On November 11, 2015, the band announced their signing to We Are Triumphant. On January 14, 2016, The band's sophomore album Frigid Future, would see an official release on March 18, 2016. Shortly after its initial release, a music video for the first single "Haunted" was premiered on March 30, 2016.

A Scent Like Wolves briefly signed to their hometown record label CI Records on February 26, 2018. The following day, the artist stated their new EP, Spirit Vessel, would be released on 
March 30, 2018. A video for “Angelwrath” featuring Ryo Kinoshita of Crystal Lake was released on March 15, 2018. A Scent Like Wolves announced a second tour of Asia on March 18, 2018. They toured China, South Korea, and Japan from April 26-May 13 with supporting bands End These Days, abstracts, and Sailing Before The Wind. The artist performed at Taihu Midi Music Festival on May 1, 2018 alongside bands Death Angel and At The Gates.

On November 24, 2020, A Scent Like Wolves announced their new album Mystic Auras and re-signed to label We Are Triumphant. The album features a wide range of notable vocalists such as JT Cavey (Erra), Booka Nile (Make Them Suffer), Matteo Gelsomino (Novelists (band)), and Brian Wille of the SharpTone Records band Currents. The album was produced by Grammy-nominated producers Carson Slovak & Grant McFarland of the Rise Records band Galactic Empire. Alternative Press shared the band's single "Poison" on January 13, 2021.

Band Members
Current
 Al Boltz - vocals (2010–present)
 Nick Boltz - vocals (2012–present)
 Jeff Brown - guitar (2010–present)
 Cody Frain - drums (2014–present)
 Blake McClimon - guitar (2018–present)

Former
 Kyle Pettigrew - guitar (2015–2020)
 Nate Kintzer - rhythm guitar (2012–2015)
 Billy Hoier - bass guitar (2011–2016)
 Derek Sattazhan - drums (2010–2012)

Former Touring Members
 Robert Warden - guitar/bass (2017–2018)
 Ryan Turley - bass (2016–2017)

Discography

Studio albums

EPs

Singles

References 

Musical groups from Pennsylvania
Metalcore musical groups from Pennsylvania
Musical groups established in 2010
Musical quintets
Heavy metal musical groups from Pennsylvania
2010 establishments in Pennsylvania